Moving the Mountain is a 1993 Canadian documentary film on the effects of the head tax and Chinese Exclusion Act in Canada. The film debuted at the Toronto International Film Festival in 1993 was co-directed by William Ging Wee Dere and Malcolm Guy, written by William G.W. Dere and produced by Productions Multi-Monde of Montreal.

References

External links

Canadian documentary films
1993 films
Documentary films about racism in Canada
Films about Chinese Canadians
1993 documentary films
History of Chinese Canadians
Anti-Chinese legislation
Documentary films about immigration
Anti-Chinese sentiment in Canada
Films about immigration in Canada
1990s Canadian films